Arizona's 12th Legislative District is one of 30 in the state, located in southeast Maricopa County, and a slight section in Pinal County. As of 2018 there are 38 precincts in the district, 37 in Maricopa and 1 in Pinal, with a total registered voter population of 196,341. The district has an overall population of 263,664.

Political representation
The district is represented for the 2021–2022 Legislative Session in the State Senate by Warren Petersen (R, Gilbert) and in the House of Representatives by Travis Grantham (R, Gilbert) and Jake Hoffman (R, Gilbert).

References

Maricopa County, Arizona
Pinal County, Arizona
Arizona legislative districts